Visual Entertainment Inc. (VEI) is a home video/television distribution company that is based in Toronto, Ontario.  An independent label, it has released several well-known TV series on DVD, some through sub-licensing deals with other labels such as Universal Pictures and CBS Home Entertainment.

In 2014, Phase 4 Films became VEI's new US distributor.

Releases

Children
The Adventures Of Cheburashka And Friends
Adventures of Mowgli 
Around the World in 80 Days
Arthur and the Square Knights of the Round Table
The Big Adventure Series
Dinky Dog
Drak Pack
Earthworm Jim
Gordon the Garden Gnome
The Secret World Of Og
Wing Commander Academy

Documentaries
 Crime Inc.
 Our Own Private Bin Laden
 Arthur C. Clarke's Mysterious World
 Arthur C. Clarke's World of Strange Powers
 Arthur C. Clarke's Mysterious Universe
 In Search of...

Reality shows
Airline
The Amazing Kreskin
Cheaters
Hell's Kitchen (U.S. series)
Ramsay's Kitchen Nightmares

TV Series

21 Jump Street
Angie
The Bad News Bears
Barnaby Jones
Baywatch
Bizarre
Cagney & Lacey
Cannon
Cobra
Dan August
Deadly Games
Desmond's
Diagnosis: Murder
The Division
Early Edition
The Equalizer
Evening Shade
Galavant
Gimme a Break!
Grace Under Fire
The Greatest American Hero
Hardcastle and McCormick
Highlander: The Series
Highway to Heaven
Hotel
Hunter
The Immortal (1970 TV series)
In Search of...
The Invisible Man
Jake and the Fatman
Jake 2.0
Kate & Allie
Level 9
Longstreet
The Magician
Martial Law
Matt Houston
McCloud
McMillan & Wife
Mind Your Language
The Mod Squad
Nash Bridges
Nero Wolfe
On The Buses
Only When I Laugh
The Parkers
The Persuaders!
Petrocelli
Poltergeist: The Legacy
The Powers of Matthew Star
Promised Land
The Protectors
Renegade
Return to Eden
Riptide
The Sentinel
Seven Days
Silk Stalkings
Sister Sister
The Smith Family
The Snoop Sisters
Sordid Lives: The Series
Stargate SG1
Stargate Atlantis
Stargate Universe
Special Unit 2
Stingray
The Stockard Channing Show
Street Justice
Super Force
That's My Boy
The Trials of Rosie O'Neill
Twice in a Lifetime
The Untouchables
Viper
Wiseguy

References

External links

Home video companies of Canada
Companies based in Toronto
2005 establishments in Ontario